The NWA Southern Tag Team Championship was the primary professional wrestling tag team title of the National Wrestling Alliance-affiliated Georgia Championship Wrestling. It was originally won by Chris and Babe Zaharias in Atlanta, Georgia in March 1949, and defended for almost twenty years until it was replaced by the NWA Georgia Tag Team Championship in 1968. This title was one of several regional NWA Southern Heavyweight Championships which included the Carolinas, Florida, Louisiana and Tennessee versions.

Title history

References

National Wrestling Alliance championships
Tag team wrestling championships
Regional professional wrestling championships
Professional wrestling in Georgia (U.S. state)